Asbury Francis "Frank" Lever (January 5, 1875 – April 28, 1940) was a member of the United States House of Representatives from South Carolina.

Early life
Frank Lever was born near Springhill, Lexington County, South Carolina on January 5, 1875. He was the son of a farmer, Asbury Francis Washington Lever, and Mary Elvira Derrick. He attended the county schools and  graduated from Newberry College with honors in 1895.  He taught school for two years.

He moved to Washington, D.C. as the private secretary to Representative J. William Stokes from 1897 to 1901. He graduated from the Law Department of Georgetown University, Washington, D.C., in 1899 and was admitted to the bar in South Carolina the same year but did not practice.

He married Lucile Scurry Butler in 1911. They had two children.

Political career
He was a delegate to the Democratic State conventions in 1896 and 1900. He was elected a member of the South Carolina House of Representatives in 1901. He was elected as a Democrat to the Fifty-seventh Congress to fill the vacancy caused by the death of J. William Stokes was reelected to the Fifty-eighth and to the eight succeeding Congresses and served from November 5, 1901, until August 1, 1919.

Lever was the chairman of the House Committee on Education from 1911 to 1913 (Sixty-second Congress) and Committee on Agriculture (Sixty-third through Sixty-fifth Congresses).  His major legislative achievements were in the area of state and federal efforts in agricultural and rural life. Major bills were the Smith-Lever Act of 1914 that established the Cooperative Extension Service, the Cotton Futures Act of 1914, the Cotton Warehouse Act of 1916, Federal Farm Loan Act of 1916 that created the Farm Credit Administration, and the Food and Fuel Control Act of 1917 that created a Food Administration and a Fuel Administration for World War I.

He resigned from Congress to become a member of the Federal Farm Loan Board, in which capacity he served until 1922. He briefly ran for the Democratic nomination for Governor of South Carolina in 1930, but sickness ended his campaign.

Later life
He was a Chair of the Board of Trustees of Newberry College and Life Trustee of Clemson College from 1913 to 1940. He was a director of the public relations administration of the Farm Credit Administration until his death.

He died on April 28, 1940, at “Seven Oaks,” in Lexington County, South Carolina. He is interred at Woodland Cemetery (Cemetery Hill), on campus of Clemson Agricultural College of South Carolina, Clemson, South Carolina.

Legacy

The Cooperative Extension Service is a legacy to Lever. This helped transform rural America. The Liberty Ship  was named after Lever. Lever Hall, a high-rise dormitory on the Clemson University campus, is named after Lever.

The Clemson University Library has Lever's papers.

References

1875 births
1940 deaths
Newberry College alumni
Georgetown University Law Center alumni
Clemson University trustees
People from Lexington County, South Carolina
Democratic Party members of the United States House of Representatives from South Carolina